The 2019 Arizona Tennis Classic was a professional tennis tournament played on hard courts. It was the first edition of the tournament which was part of the 2019 ATP Challenger Tour. It took place in Phoenix, Arizona, United States between 11 and 17 March 2019.

Singles main-draw entrants

Seeds

 1 Rankings are as of 4 March 2019.

Other entrants
The following players received wildcards into the singles main draw:
  Jérémy Chardy
  David Goffin
  Ernests Gulbis
  John Millman
  Tseng Chun-hsin

The following players received entry into the singles main draw as alternates:
  Andrea Arnaboldi
  Salvatore Caruso
  Ernesto Escobedo
  Egor Gerasimov
  Peđa Krstin
  Nicola Kuhn
  Yasutaka Uchiyama
  Mikael Ymer

The following players received entry from the qualifying draw:
  Frederik Nielsen
  Nathan Ponwith

The following players received entry as lucky losers:
  Dominik Kellovský
  Fabrice Martin

Champions

Singles

  Matteo Berrettini def.  Mikhail Kukushkin 3–6, 7–6(8–6), 7–6(7–2).

Doubles

  Jamie Murray /  Neal Skupski def.  Austin Krajicek /  Artem Sitak 6–7(2–7), 7–5, [10–6].

References

2019 ATP Challenger Tour
Sports competitions in Phoenix, Arizona
2019 in American tennis
March 2019 sports events in the United States